Several ships of the Argentine Navy have been named ARA San Luis (or San Luis before the 1860s):

 , a felucca that served in the second Argentine squadron during the Independence War
 , a  originally ordered by Argentina that was purchased by Greece (as Aetos) in 1912 before delivery
 , a Type 209 submarine in service with Argentina from 1974 to 1997

Argentine Navy ship names